Givira daphne is a moth in the family Cossidae first described by Herbert Druce in 1901. It is found in Colombia.

References

Givira
Moths described in 1901